SS Daniel J. Morrell was a  Great Lakes freighter that broke up in a strong storm on Lake Huron on 29 November 1966, taking with her 28 of her 29 crewmen. The freighter was used to carry bulk cargoes such as iron ore but was running with only ballast when the 60-year-old ship sank.

Name
The ship was named for Daniel Johnson Morrell, the general superintendent and manager of the Cambria Iron Company, and a U.S. Representative from Pennsylvania.

History
Daniel J. Morrell was built at West Bay City, Michigan, by the West Bay City Shipbuilding Company, for the Cambria Steamship Company, the Cambria Iron Company's marine subsidiary that they had formed earlier that year and launched on 22 August 1906. Cambria chartered both Daniel J. Morrell and her sister ship, to sail for the M. A. Hanna Company, one of the most experienced vessel management firms on the lakes. In 1930, Daniel J. Morrell and Edward Y. Townsend came under management of the Bethlehem Transportation Corporation.

"A bizarre incident"
Making the last run of the season with Edward Y. Townsend, Daniel J. Morrell became caught in winds exceeding  and swells that topped the height of the ship ( waves). During the early morning hours, Edward Y. Townsend made the decision to take shelter in the St. Clair River, leaving Daniel J. Morrell alone on the waters north of Pointe Aux Barques, Michigan, heading for the protection of Thunder Bay. At 02:00, the ship began her death throes, forcing the crew onto the deck, where many jumped to their deaths in the  Lake Huron waters. At 02:15, the ship broke in half, with the remaining crew on the bow loading into a raft. While they waited for the bow to sink, there were shouts that a ship had been spotted off the port bow. Moments later, it was discovered that the looming object was not another ship, but Daniel J. Morrells aft section, barreling towards them under the power of the ship's engine. The bow then sank, throwing the raft into the lake. In the words of writer William Ratigan, the vessel's stern disappeared into the darkness "like a great wounded beast with its head shot off".

Overdue
Daniel J. Morrell was not reported missing until 12:15, the following afternoon, 30 November, after the vessel was overdue at her destination, Taconite Harbor, Minnesota. The U.S. Coast Guard issued a "be on the lookout" alert and dispatched several vessels and aircraft to search for the missing freighter.

At around 16:00, on 30 November, a Coast Guard helicopter located the lone survivor, 26-year-old Watchman Dennis Hale, nearly frozen and floating in a lifeboat with the bodies of three of his crewmates who had managed to climb into the boat, but succumbed one by one to the elements.<ref
name=Huron></ref> Hale had survived for nearly 40 hours in frigid temperatures wearing only a pair of boxer shorts, a lifejacket, and a pea coat. Afterward, he had more than a dozen surgeries as a result of his ordeal.<ref
name=Huron/>

Edward Y. Townsend, after having escaped the same fate as her sister, had been discovered as having a large crack in her deck that grew worse from the same storm; she was declared a total loss and was docked for almost two years. Plans were made to tow the vessel to Europe to be scrapped. On her way during tow, she was caught in a strong storm on 7 October 1968, off Newfoundland and snapped in two, foundering in the general vicinity that  had sunk. The German saltie Nordmeer, which had grounded at Thunder Bay Island Shoal on 19 November, was declared a total loss after the additional damage to its bottom caused by the storm.

The destructive force of the November seas and wind were an important factor in this loss, as it has been in many similar incidents on the Great Lakes. The Coast Guard investigation of the sinking of Daniel J. Morrell concluded that she broke in half due to the brittle steel used in her hull which was a "common problem" in ships built before 1948.

Details from the song "32 Down on the Robert MacKenzie" from Canadian TV series Due South echo both the sinkings of the Edmund Fitzgerald (total loss of life, and grounding on Six-Fathom Shoal) and Daniel J. Morrell (the stern breaking off and continuing on under its own power, though in the song the stern section of the titular boat immediately rams the severed bow).

Fate of the crew

The remains of 26 of the 28 lost crewmen were recovered, most in the days following the sinking, although bodies from Daniel J. Morrell continued to be found well into May of the following year. The two men whose bodies were never recovered were declared legally dead in May 1967. The sole survivor of the sinking, Dennis Hale, died of cancer on 2 September 2015, at the age of 75.

See also 
Great Lakes Storm of 1913
Great Storms of the North American Great Lakes

References

Further reading
 
Kantar, Andrew. Deadly Voyage: The S.S. Daniel J. Morrell Tragedy. East Lansing: Michigan State University Press, 2009. ISBN 9780870138638.
 Ratigan, Bill. Great Lakes Shipwrecks and Survivals. Grand Rapids: WB Eerdmans, 1977.
 NPR Staff. (December 6, 2013). "Adrift In Frigid Water, Not Caring 'If You Live Or Die'." NPR. Retrieved December 6, 2013.

External links
 
National Transportation Safety Board Marine Accident: Sinking of SS Daniel J. Morrell
 University of Detroit Mercy
 Great Lakes Shipwreck Files
 Great Lakes Vessels Online Index: Daniel J. Morrell
 The Morrell Survey
 Biographical Directory of the United States Congress: MORRELL, Daniel Johnson, (1821 - 1885)

Shipwrecks of Lake Huron
Maritime incidents in 1966
Steamships of the United States
Merchant ships of the United States
1906 ships
Ships built in Bay City, Michigan
Queen of the Lakes
Ships powered by a triple expansion steam engine
Great Lakes freighters